This is a list of seasons played by German women's football club 1. FFC Turbine Potsdam in German and European football, from the creation of the East German women's football championship in 1979 to the last completed season. Turbine competed in East German football between 1979 and 1991 and in all-German competitions from the 1991–92 season onwards.

Summary

References

Turbine Potsdam
Turbine Potsdam